Amphidromus contrarius is a species of air-breathing land snail, a terrestrial pulmonate gastropod mollusk in the family Camaenidae.

Amphidromus contrarius is the type species of the subgenus Syndromus.

Subspecies
 Amphidromus contrarius maculata Fulton, 1896
 Amphidromus contrarius multifasciata Fulton, 1896

Distribution
Distribution of Amphidromus contrarius include central Timor in Indonesia.

Description

References

External links 

contrarius
Gastropods described in 1774
Taxa named by Otto Friedrich Müller